The California Wine Club is a wine club co-founded in 1990 by Bruce and Pam Boring in Ventura, California and is considered one of the largest mail-order wine businesses in the United States. The club offers hand-selected wines on a monthly basis from boutique and small, family-owned wineries in California, Oregon and Washington State, and other countries such as France, Italy, and Austria.

Cork recycling program
The California Wine Club partnered with ReCork, a natural wine cork recycling program, in July 2011 to conduct a nationwide cork drive.

Uncorked, The California Wine Club newsletter
Shipments from The California Wine Club include their newsletter, Uncorked. Uncorked is a full magazine featuring glossy pictures and articles. It also includes tasting notes for featured wines, interviews, recipes, and more.

See also 
Wine clubs
Wine tasting
Aging of wine
Aroma of wine

References

External links 
The California Wine Club official website

Wine tasting
Companies based in Greater Los Angeles
Economy of Ventura, California
American companies established in 1990